Shadows of Sing Sing is a 1933 American pre-Code crime drama film, directed by Phil Rosen. It stars Mary Brian, Bruce Cabot, and Grant Mitchell, and was released on October 27, 1933.

Cast list
 Mary Brian as Muriel Ross, aka Muriel Rossi
 Bruce Cabot as Bob Martel
 Grant Mitchell as Joe Martel
 Harry Woods as Al Rossi
 Claire DuBrey as Angela Crane
 Bradley Page as Slick Hale
 Irving Bacon as Highbrow
 Dewey Robinson as Dumpy
 Fred Kelsey as Murphy
 Charles Wilson

References

External links 
 
 
 

American crime drama films
1933 crime drama films
American black-and-white films
Films with screenplays by Kathryn Scola
1933 films
Films directed by Phil Rosen
1930s American films
1930s English-language films